Wild blue yonder may refer to:
"The U.S. Air Force", the official song of the United States Air Force, often referred to as "Wild Blue Yonder"
The Wild Blue Yonder, a 1951 American war film
The Wild Blue Yonder, a 2005 science fiction film by Werner Herzog
Wild blue yonder, a Crayola color (see List of Crayola crayon colors)
"Wild Blue Yonder", a 1984 single by Screaming Blue Messiahs, from their Gun Shy LP
Wild Blue Yonder, a 1998 album by Flat Duo Jets
"Wild Blue Yonder", a 2006 single by Paul Weller
Wild Blue Yonder, a Christian band
Wild Blue Yonder, a West Coast band from the 1980s
"Wild Blue Yonder", a 2020 song by The Amazing Devil, from their album The Horror and the Wild

See also
BlueYonder, formerly JDA Software